Guzik is a Polish surname meaning "button". Notable people with the surname include:

Alberto Guzik (1944-2010), Brazilian actor
Anna Guzik (born 1976), Polish actress
Grzegorz Guzik (born 1991), Polish biathlete
Jake Guzik (1886-1956), American mobster
John Guzik (linebacker) (1936-2012), American football player
John Guzik (defensive lineman) (born 1962), American football player
Martin Guzik (born 1974), Czech footballer
Tomasz Guzik (born 1974), Polish scientist

Polish-language surnames